The Ulakhan-Bom (meaning "Big Obstacle") is a range of mountains in far North-eastern Russia, a southern prolongation of the Verkhoyansk Range, part of the East Siberian System. Administratively the mountain chain belongs to the Sakha Republic. 

The urban locality of Solnechny is located near the slopes of the range, by the Allakh-Yun River.

Geography
It is bound in the north by the Tompo River, which separates it from the Verkhoyansk Range proper. To the west it is bound by the wide Aldan River valley and to the south by the Yudoma River. The Tyry river cuts across the northern section of the Ulakhan-Bom. The Khanda river cuts across the range further south. The smaller Kyllakh Range rises west of the Khanda valley, in the southwestern side of the Ulakhan-Bom, between the Aldan and the southern section of its western slopes.

Flora
The slopes of the range are mostly bare, but covered by larch taiga in slopes just above valleys, as well as birch in slopes facing the Aldan. Most of the river valleys are swampy with widespread moss growth. Thickets of Siberian pine and mountain tundra grow at elevations above .

See also
List of mountains and hills of Russia

References

External links
Geography of Russia - Mountains of North-Eastern Siberia (in Russian)
Tourist routes of Yakutia 
Verkhoyansk Range
Mountain ranges of the Sakha Republic

ceb:Khrebet Ulakhan-Bom
[[it:Monti Ulachan-Bom
pl:Ułachan-Bom